The first appearance of freestyle skiing at the Winter Universiade was as an optional sport in the 2005 edition which was held in Innsbruck, Austria. Due to the growing demands, the Fédération Internationale du Sport Universitaire decided to turn it a mandatory sporting starting at the 2021 Winter Universiade.

Events

Medalists

Men

Aerials

Moguls

Dual Moguls

Halfpipe

Slopestyle

Skicross

Women

Aerials

Moguls

Dual Moguls

Halfpipe

Slopestyle

Skicross

Mixed

Aerials Team

Medal table 
Last updated after the 2023 Winter Universiade

References

External links
Sports123

 
Universiade
Sports at the Winter Universiade